Daniel Vancsik (born 7 January 1977) is an Argentine professional golfer.

Early life
Vancsik was born in Posadas, Argentina. He started playing the game when he was 12 at the Tacuru Club in Posadas-Misiones-Argentina.

Professional career
Vancsik turned professional in 1997 and has played in Europe since 2003, initially on the second tier Challenge Tour, on which he won three tournaments, and later on the main European Tour. His collected his first win on the European Tour at the 2007 Madeira Islands Open BPI. 

In May 2009, he won the BMW Italian Open in Turin, beating John Daly, Raphaël Jacquelin and Robert Rock by six shots.

Professional wins (12)

European Tour wins (2)

Challenge Tour wins (3)

1Co-sanctioned by the Tour de las Américas

Challenge Tour playoff record (1–0)

TPG Tour wins (2)

Other wins (5)
2000 Pinamar Open (Arg), Rio Cuarto Open (Arg)
2003 Viña del Mar Open (Arg)
2006 Carilo Open (Arg)
2009 Juan Jose Galli Cup (Arg) (with Joaquín Estévez)

Results in World Golf Championships

"T" = Tied

See also
2005 Challenge Tour graduates
2006 European Tour Qualifying School graduates

References

External links

Argentine male golfers
European Tour golfers
Sportspeople from Misiones Province
People from Posadas, Misiones
1977 births
Living people